John Patrick O'Shea (born 2 June 1940) is a former  international rugby union player.

Educated at Lewis School Pengam, along with John Dawes, he was capped five times for Wales as a prop between 1967 and 1968.

O'Shea was selected for the 1968 British Lions tour to South Africa and played in the first international against . In the match against Eastern Transvaal at Springs he became the first Lion ever to be sent off for foul play, after throwing a punch.

He played club rugby for Cardiff.

He is currently living in Australia.

References

1940 births
Living people
Barbarian F.C. players
British & Irish Lions rugby union players from Wales
Cardiff RFC players
Newbridge RFC players
Newport HSOB RFC players
People educated at Lewis School, Pengam
Rugby union players from Weston-Super-Mare
Rugby union props
Wales international rugby union players
Welsh people of Irish descent
Welsh rugby union players